Major-General George Hanbury Noble Jackson  (20 December 1876 – 4 September 1958) was a British Army officer.

Military career
Educated at Neuenhein College, Heidelberg and the Royal Military College, Sandhurst, Jackson was commissioned into the Border Regiment on 20 February 1897. He saw action at the Relief of Ladysmith and the Battle of Spion Kop in January 1900 and at the Battle of the Tugela Heights in February 1900 in South Africa during the Second Boer War.

He served initially as a staff officer and then as commander of the 87th Infantry Brigade from January 1918 during the First World War.

He became commander of 7th Infantry Brigade at Salisbury Plain in November 1923 and General Officer Commanding the 49th (West Riding) Infantry Division in September 1931 before retiring in September 1935.

Family
In 1917, he married Eileen Dudgeon.

References

1876 births
1958 deaths
British Army major generals
Companions of the Order of the Bath
Companions of the Order of St Michael and St George
Companions of the Distinguished Service Order
Border Regiment officers
British Army generals of World War I
Graduates of the Royal Military College, Sandhurst
British Army personnel of the Second Boer War